Glamorous Life is an album by the jazz pianist Junko Onishi, recorded and released in 2017.

Track listing

Personnel 
 Junko Onishi – piano
 Yousuke Inoue – bass
 Shinnosuke Takahashi – drums

Production 
 Producer – Junko Onishi
 Co-producer – Hitoshi Namekata (Names Inc.), Ryoko Sakamoto (disunion)
 Recording and mixing engineer – Shinya Matsushita (STUDIO Dede)
 Recorded at Sound City A-studio, Sound City Setagaya
 Assistant engineer – Taiyo Nakayama (Sound City)
 Mastering engineer – Akihito Yoshikawa (STUDIO Dede)
 Cover photo – Haruyuki Shirai, Tetsuya Kurahara
 Art director – Takuma Hojo
 Hair and make-up artist – Naoki Katagiri (EFFECTOR)
 Stylist – Yuka Kikuchi

Release history

References

External links
 Glamorous Life / Junko Onishi – disk union
 
 

2017 albums
Junko Onishi albums